This is the complete filmography of actress Amzie Strickland (January 10, 1919 - July 5, 2006).

1930s

1940s

1950s

1960s

1970s

1980s

1990s to 2000s

References

Actress filmographies
American filmographies